The Hunted Lady is a 1977 American TV movie starring Donna Mills as a woman who goes on the run. It was a pilot for a TV series that never eventuated but screened as a stand-alone film.

Credits
 A Quinn Martin Production
 Executive Producer: Quinn Martin
 Producer: William Robert Yates
 Director: Richard Lang
 Written by William Robert Yates
 Director of Photography: Paul Lohmann
 Running Time: 99 minutes

Plot
When two detectives uncover the truth about a United States senator's closed ties to the criminal underworld, one ends up dead, and the other - Susan Reilly - is framed for his murder.  Strong evidence and a weak alibi combine to turn all sides solidly against her, including her fellow officers and superiors in the Los Angeles Police Department.  Unable to prove her innocence, Susan escapes, in search of the answers that can clear her name before the police catch her, but more than her freedom is threatened.  When the mob finds out that the sharp-eyed young female detective is on the loose, they send out an assassin with very specific orders: find her, then silence her.

Cast
 Donna Mills as Susan Reilly
 Lawrence Casey as Robert Armstrong
 Robert Reed as Dr. Arthur Sills
 Andrew Duggan as Captain Shannon
 Alan Feinstein as Sergeant Arizzio
 Geoffrey Lewis as Mr. Eckert
 Michael McGuire as Lieutenant Jacks
 Jenny O'Hara as Carol Arizzio
 Quinn Redeker as Max Devine
 Jess Walton as Helen Weiss

Production
The success of Charlie's Angels in the 1976-77 ratings season prompted all the American TV networks to feature more sexy young women in action-orientated roles, either adding them to existing programs or introducing new shows that focused on them.  NBC picked up The Bionic Woman from ABC and also added young female characters to the 1977–78 seasons of Baa Baa Black Sheep and BJ and the Bear. They introduced several new shows with female sex symbol leads such as Quark, The Roller Girls and Who's Watching the Kids?, as well as commissioning pilots for several series which were direct imitations of Charlie's Angels: The Secret War of Jackie's Girls, The Hunted Lady and Cover Girls.

Reception
It was the 28th highest rated show of the week.

References

Notes

External links
The Hunted Lady at Letterbox DVD

1977 television films
1977 films
American television films
American crime drama films
1970s English-language films
1970s American films